Fire Serpent is a 2007 Sci Fi Channel monster movie directed by John Terlesky.

Plot

A solar flare from the sun sends a serpentine alien composed of fire to Earth where it begins to wreak havoc throughout a small community. During its search for more fuel to consume it stumbles upon a large military oil reserve. It soon becomes clear that an old man may hold the key to destroying it in the form of a Halogen Gun which may be used as a makeshift fire extinguisher of sorts. A small group of citizens decides to use this technology to make a stand against the creature only to face additional resistance from the beast, as well as a government employer who voluntarily helps the snake because he believes it is the spirit of a god.

Cast
 Nicholas Brendon as Jake Relm
 Sandrine Holt as Christina Andrews  
 Randolph Mantooth as Dutch Fallon
Diego Klattenhoff as Young Dutch Fallon
 Robert Beltran as Cooke  
 Lisa Langlois as Heather Allman  
 Patrice Goodman as Billie  
 Steve Boyle as Dave Massaro
 Richard Clarkin as Kohler   
 Michelle Morgan as Donna Marks
 Vito Rezza as The Bartender
 Joseph Motiki as Lieutenant Oliver
 Marco Bianco as State Trooper Parsons

Reception

David Cornelius from DVD Talk gave the film a negative review, writing, "Fire Serpent is a wretched sci-fi/horror mess, with laughable CGI effects, an empty plot, and zero suspense. (In other words, it's your run-of-the-mill Sci-Fi Channel production. Zing!) It's the kind of B picture that fails not because it's cheap, but because it's terminally dull." Jon Condit from Dread Central awarded the film a negative score of 1 out of five, calling it "dull".

References

External links
 

2007 films
2007 television films
Syfy original films
Canadian science fiction television films
English-language Canadian films
Canadian science fiction horror films
2007 horror films
2000s science fiction horror films
2000s monster movies
Films about firefighting
CineTel Films films
American monster movies
Canadian horror television films
Films directed by John Terlesky
2000s American films
2000s Canadian films